Gurcharan Kaur (born 4 February 1936) is an Indian politician. She was a Member of Parliament, representing Punjab in the Rajya Sabha the upper house of India's Parliament as a member of the Bharatiya Janata Party.

References

Rajya Sabha members from Punjab, India
Bharatiya Janata Party politicians from Punjab
Women members of the Rajya Sabha
1936 births
Living people